Beate Lobenstein (Beate Moros-Lobenstein; born December 20, 1970) is a German para swimmer. She competed in the 1992, 1996 and 2000 Summer Paralympics, winning a gold, four silver and five bronze medals.

In 1992, she was voted Sportswoman of the Year in Saxony-Anhalt.  In 1993, she received the Silver Laurel Leaf for her athletic achievements.  . A star was laid in her honor on the Magdeburg Sports Walk of Fame on the Breite Weg.

Career 

Lobenstein swam for the Magdeburg clubs BSG Aufbau Börde, and later for the club for sports therapy and disabled sports 1980 (VSB 1980).

At the 1992 Summer Paralympics, she won a gold medal in the Women's 4 x 100 meters Medley S7-10, silver medal in the Women's 4 x 100 meters Medley S7-10, and bronze medals in the Women's 4 x 100 meters Freestyle S7-10, Women's 100 meters Breaststroke SB9, and Women's 200 meters Medley SM9.

At the 1996 Summer Paralympics, she won a silver medal in Women's 4 x 100 meters Medley S7-10, and bronze medal in Women's 4 x 100 meters Freestyle S7-10. She competed in Women's 50 meters Freestyle S9, Women's 100 meters Freestyle S9, Women's 100 meters Backstroke S9, Women's 100 meters Breaststroke SB9, Women's 100 meters Butterfly S9, and Women's 200 meters Medley SM9.

She won bronze in the medley relay at the 1998 World Championships. At the 1999 European Championships, she won gold in the 100 meters freestyle relay and bronze in the 100 meters backstroke.

At the 2000 Summer Paralympics, she competed in Women's 50 meters Freestyle S9, Women's 100 meters Freestyle S9, Women's 100 meters Backstroke S9, Women's 100 meters Breaststroke SB9, Women's 200 meters Medley SM9, and Women's 4 x 100 meters Medley 34 pts.

Overall, she won 91 medals at national and international championships.

References 

Living people
1970 births
Paralympic swimmers of Germany
German female swimmers
Swimmers at the 1992 Summer Paralympics
Swimmers at the 1996 Summer Paralympics
Swimmers at the 2000 Summer Paralympics
Medalists at the 1992 Summer Paralympics
Medalists at the 1996 Summer Paralympics
Paralympic gold medalists for Germany
Paralympic silver medalists for Germany
Paralympic bronze medalists for Germany
S9-classified Paralympic swimmers
Medalists at the World Para Swimming Championships
Place of birth missing (living people)